This article presents the Swedish discography of Cornelis Vreeswijk, Dutch-Swedish composer, singer, and guitar player.

Studio albums
1964 - Ballader och oförskämdheter
1965 - Ballader och grimascher
1966 - Grimascher och telegram
1968 - Tio vackra visor och Personliga Person
1969 - Cornelis sjunger Taube
1970 - Poem, ballader och lite blues
1971 - Spring mot Ulla, spring! Cornelis sjunger Bellman
1972 - Visor, svarta och röda
1973 - Istället för vykort
1973 - Linnéas fina visor
1974 - Getinghonung
1976 - Narrgnistor och transkriptioner
1977 - Movitz! Movitz!
1978 - Cornelis sjunger Victor Jara
1978 - Narrgnistor 2, En halv böj blues och andra ballader
1978 - Felicia´s svenska suite
1979 - Vildhallon
1981 - Turistens klagan
1980 - En spjutkastares visor
1980 - Bananer - bland annat
1981 - Cornelis sjunger Povel
1981 - Hommager och Pamfletter
1985 - Mannen som älskade träd
1986 - I elfte timmen
1987 - Till Fatumeh - Rapport från de osaligas ängder

Live albums
1965 - Visor och oförskämdheter
1972 - Östen, Enrst-Hugo & Cornelis på börsen
1972 - Cornelis live!
1979 - Cornelis - Live. Montmartre-Köpenhamn Vol 1
1979 - Cornelis - Live. Montmartre-Köpenhamn Vol 2
1979 - Cornelis - Live. Montmartre-Köpenhamn
1979 - Jazz incorporated

Compilations and posthumous albums
1978 - Från narrgnistor och transkriptioner och Linnéas fina visor
1985 - Cornelis Bästa
1990 - Cornelis sjunger Bellman och Forssell
1993 - Mäster Cees memoarer|Mäster Cees memoarer vol. 1–5
1995 - Cornelis på Mosebacke
1996 - Guldkorn från Mäster Cees memoarer
1998 - Gömda guldkorn
2000 - Till sist
2000 - Bellman, Taube och lite galet
2000 - En fattig trubadur
2001 - Guldkorn: En rolig jävel
2001 - Guldkorn: Romantikern
2001 - Guldkorn: Samhällskritikern
2002 - Black girl
2003 - Bästa (Cornelis Vreeswijk samlingsalbum)|Bästa
2004 - Cornelis i Saltis
2007 - CV Det Bästa Med Cornelis Vreeswijk

Discographies of Swedish artists
Folk music discographies

sv:Cornelis Vreeswijk#Diskografi